Boyce College is a private, Baptist Christian college located in the Crescent Hill neighborhood of Louisville, Kentucky. It is affiliated with the Southern Baptist Theological Seminary (Southern Baptist Convention). Boyce College was founded in 1998 by R. Albert Mohler Jr. as the undergraduate school of the Southern Baptist Theological Seminary, and receives its accreditation from the Southern Association of Colleges and Schools and the Association of Theological Schools in the United States and Canada.

History
Boyce College is the successor of Boyce Bible School, which was formed in 1974 and offered an associate of arts degree. It is named for James Petigru Boyce, the first president of Southern Seminary. In 1998, under the guidance of the seminary's ninth president, Albert Mohler, Boyce Bible School became Boyce College and began offering six bachelor's degrees in addition to the associate degree. While offering seven different ministry-related degree programs, Boyce College's enrollment has grown over 700% in the ensuing years.

Boyce College was originally housed in W.O. Carver Hall, but was moved into the newly renovated Mullins Complex in August 2014. The renovation of Mullins includes 86 suite-style dormitories with 350 beds, 17 faculty offices, and Sampey Commons (a gathering area that includes a rock climbing wall, two kitchens, a recording studio, and an entertainment lounge). Boyce College continues to share classrooms with Southern Seminary in W.O. Carver Hall, Rankin Hall, and Norton Hall.  It also shares the Honeycutt Campus Center and the James P. Boyce Centennial Library with the seminary community.

In 2016, Boyce College opened the Augustine Honors Collegium, an honors, seminar-based program. The Collegium publishes a biannual academic journal, The Augustine Collegiate Review.

Accreditation 
It is affiliated with the Southern Baptist Theological Seminary (Southern Baptist Convention).

Athletics
Boyce College has five sports teams which all compete in the NCCAA Division II – Mid-East Region.

Boyce added its first sports team, a men's basketball team, in fall 2013. In the 2013–14 season, the team placed third in the Region. Notable basketball players include Ben Akers, who received the 2016 Pete Maravich Award.

In fall 2015, Boyce added a men's soccer team. In fall 2021, Boyce soccer won the first Mideast regional championship in school history. On November 6, they defeated CU Harrodsburg by a score of 6-1. The team was led in goals scored by Yonelson Alvarez and Caleb Sites, with 2 goals each.

In fall 2016, Boyce added a women's volleyball team.

In fall 2022, Boyce added a men's and women's cross country team.

Notable alumni
 FLAME (hip hop recording artist)
 Trip Lee (hip hop recording artist and author)

References

Southern Baptist Theological Seminary
Baptist Christianity in Kentucky
Educational institutions established in 1998
Universities and colleges affiliated with the Southern Baptist Convention
Universities and colleges accredited by the Southern Association of Colleges and Schools
Christianity in Louisville, Kentucky
Seminaries and theological colleges in Kentucky
Universities and colleges in Louisville, Kentucky
1998 establishments in Kentucky